The New York Daily Mirror was an American morning tabloid newspaper first published on June 24, 1924, in New York City by the William Randolph Hearst organization as a contrast to their mainstream broadsheets, the Evening Journal and New York American, later consolidated into the New York Journal American. It was created to compete with the New York Daily News which was then a sensationalist tabloid and the most widely circulated newspaper in the United States. Hearst preferred the broadsheet format and sold the Mirror to an associate in 1928, only to buy it back in 1932.

Hearst hired Philip Payne away from the Daily News as managing editor of the Mirror. Payne's circulation building stunts ranged from reviving the sensational Hall-Mills murder case to sponsoring and being a passenger on the Old Glory, transatlantic flying record attempt, in which he was killed. Early on, several bright young writers and photographic journalists joined the Daily Mirror, such as Ring Lardner, Jr., Hy Peskin and the political commentator Drew Pearson. The poet-songwriter Nick Kenny was the paper's radio editor, and Edward Zeltner contributed a column. The gossip columnist Walter Winchell and managing editor Emile Gauvreau were both hired away from the New York Evening Graphic, the city's third sensational tabloid. Winchell was given his own radio show and syndicated, in his prime—the 1940s and early 1950s—in more than 2000 daily papers.

During the three tabloids' 1920s circulation war, management of the Mirror estimated that its content was 10% news and 90% entertainment. For example, the Mirror and Graphic both had devoted substantial resources to the exploitation of scandal with repeated stories on such events as the divorce trial of real estate tycoon Edward West "Daddy" Browning who at age 51 had married 16-year-old Frances Belle "Peaches" Heenan, as well as constant coverage of the decade's celebrities like Rudolph Valentino, Babe Ruth and Charles A. Lindbergh. 
By the 1930s, the Daily Mirror was one of the Hearst Corporation's largest papers in terms of circulation. However, the paper never became a significantly profitable property as its earnings were mostly destined to support the company's faltering afternoon papers, and in its later years it declined substantially despite numerous efforts to turn things around.

Despite having the second-highest daily circulation of an American newspaper at the time, the Daily Mirror closed in 1963, after the 114-day 1962–63 New York City newspaper strike (which also contributed to the death of the Herald Tribune, the Journal-American and the World-Telegram and Sun). On October 16, 1963, the Daily Mirror published its last issue. The Daily Mirror name rights were at that point acquired by its rival the Daily News.

On January 4, 1971, publisher Robert W. Farrell revived the New York Daily Mirror in name only, as a tabloid, published in Long Island City, Queens. Operating on a shoestring budget, the paper faced obstruction from the Daily News (from whom it had acquired the Daily Mirror name rights after the Daily News let them lapse). This new iteration of the Daily Mirror ceased publication on February 28, 1972.

See also
 Arthur Brisbane
 Jack Lait
 Tex McCrary
 Lee Mortimer
 Sidney Skolsky

References

Defunct newspapers published in New York City
Newspapers established in 1924
Publications disestablished in 1963
1924 establishments in New York City
1963 disestablishments in New York (state)
Daily newspapers published in New York City